Bielefeld University is a public university in Bielefeld, Germany. Founded in 1969, it is one of the country's newer universities, and considers itself a "reform" university, following a different style of organization and teaching than the established universities. In particular, the university aims to "re-establish the unity between research and teaching", and so all its faculty teach courses in their area of research. The university also stresses a focus on interdisciplinary research, helped by the architecture, which encloses all faculties in one great structure. It is among the first of the German universities to switch some faculties (e.g. biology) to Bachelor/Master-degrees as part of the Bologna process.

Bielefeld University has started an extensive multi-phase modernisation project, which is to be completed by 2025. A total investment of more than 1 billion euros has been planned for this undertaking.

Campus
The university is located in the west of Bielefeld next to the Teutoburg Forest. The main building, which houses all the faculties and institutes, as well as the large library, is a functional concrete structure, typical of the 1960s. The main building with 154,000m² alone is one of the largest structures in Europe.

Intercity trains running between Cologne/Bonn and Berlin stop regularly at Bielefeld, and the university can be accessed via city tram (Line 4) in about 10 minutes from the city center—or in about 15 minutes by car. The nearest airport, Paderborn/Lippstadt, is about 50 kilometres southeast of Bielefeld.

Library
Bielefeld University Library occupies most of the first floor of the main university building and contains over 2.2 million volumes. It is open every day of the year, from 08:00 until 01:00 Monday to Friday, and from 09:00 to 22:00 during weekends and public holidays.

The library's projects include the development of tools to improve access to electronic resources. It works with commercial system suppliers to meet the needs of academic libraries—collaborations that have resulted in developments such as BASE (Bielefeld Academic Search Engine), by which metadata is collected from scientific repository servers and indexed, along with data from selected web sites and data collections, using the Solr framework.

Academic profile

Rankings

In 2017, Bielefeld University was ranked 22nd in the world by the Times Higher Education (THE) Young University Rankings, and among the top 300 universities by the traditional Times Higher Education World University Rankings.

In the THE ranking of 2011 Bielefeld is placed among the top 50 universities in engineering and technology.

In terms of mathematics, the Academic Ranking of World Universities of 2018  places Bielefeld among the four best universities of Germany and 101–150 best universities in the world. The German Center for Higher Education Development Excellence Ranking, which measures academic performance of European graduate programs in biology, chemistry, mathematics, and physics, placed Bielefeld in the excellence group for mathematics.

Central academic institutes
Center for Interdisciplinary Research (ZiF)
Institute for interdisciplinary research on conflict and violence (IKG)
Center for Interamerican Studies (CIAS)
CeBiTec – Center for Biotechnology
CITEC – Cognitive Interaction Technology (Center of Excellence)
Research Institute for Cognition and Robotics (CoR-Lab)
Interdisciplinary Centre of Women's and Gender Studies 
Institute for the Simulation of Complex Systems (ISKOS)
Institute of Mathematical Economics (IMW)
Research Centre for Mathematical Modelling (FSPM)
Teacher Training Centre (ZfL – in German)

Oberstufen-Kolleg at the University of Bielefeld
The Oberstufen-Kolleg is a UNESCO Project School and as such it aims for international understanding and cooperation. Since 1998, the Kolleg has worked together with the German School of Guayaquil in a charitable project to help in the development of the town of Daular, Ecuador, which project won a United Nations Award in 2006/2007 for its international concept.

Protests against tuition fees
Bielefeld University was one of the centers of student protests in the fight against the introduction of tuition fees. In the course of the protests, the central hall and the university president's office were occupied by protesting students for over a month.
In a vote organised by the AStA and the students parliament, about 94 percent of the participants voted against the introduction of tuition fees, although only 22 percent of the students cast their vote. This is comparable to similar results at other German universities.

In its session of 12 July 2006, the university senate decided to introduce tuition fees of €500 per semester, beginning in 2007.

In August 2006, a universal key for the university went missing during a senate session. After that, multiple cases of arson and defacement of university property were reported. University president Dieter Timmermann was a particular target of these attacks. The cost of the damage, mainly due to the replacement of thousands of locks, was estimated at over a million euros.

See also
 Open access in Germany

References

External links
  
Official website of the Oberstufen-Kolleg of the University of Bielefeld 

 
Bielefeld
Bielefeld
Educational institutions established in 1969
1969 establishments in West Germany